Abel Ntuthuko Mabaso (born 15 May 1991) is a South African soccer player who plays as a defender for Premier Soccer League club Orlando Pirates.

References

1991 births
Living people
South African soccer players
Association football defenders
Mamelodi Sundowns F.C. players
Mpumalanga Black Aces F.C. players
Maritzburg United F.C. players
Cape Town Spurs F.C. players
Sportspeople from Durban
M Tigers F.C. players